Thomas Berkeley (1351–1405) was the member of Parliament for the constituency of Gloucestershire for the parliament of November 1380 and November 1390.

References 

Members of the Parliament of England for Gloucestershire
English MPs November 1380
English MPs November 1390
1351 births
1405 deaths